Bishop Feehan High School is a co-educational Catholic high school in Attleboro, Massachusetts.  It is located in the Roman Catholic Diocese of Fall River.  The school was built in 1961 and staffed by the Sisters of Mercy. The school has grown to over 1,000 students. Each class is approximately 250+ students, who are selected from a significantly larger pool of applicants.

The second of five regional, diocesan Catholic high schools constructed in the Diocese of Fall River, the school opened  in the fall of 1961.

Academics 
Feehan offers 17 AP classes and honors courses in mathematics, foreign languages, English, science and the arts.

100% of Feehan most recent graduating class was accepted to a four-year institution and 98% enrolled at a four-year institution.

Athletics 

The athletic activities include football, marching band, ice hockey, cheerleading, volleyball, cross country, basketball, track, soccer, baseball, swim, lacrosse, water polo, fencing, and some others. Bishop Feehan's football team has won numerous state titles including the latest in 2012 where they defeated Lynnfield High School at Gillette Stadium in Foxboro, MA. Feehan athletes won three state titles in 2015-16, including wins in golf, swimming and girls basketball. Feehan initiated a boys and girls lacrosse program in 2007 and more recently launched varsity field hockey and varsity girls ice hockey. The Boys Spring Track team  currently has 91 straight dual-meet wins. Most recently, the Girls Soccer team won the Division 1 state title and went undefeated the entire season.

 Boys Cross Country Team All-State Champions - 1987, 1993, 1994, 2003, 2008, 2011
 Girls Cross Country Team All-State Champions - 2003, 2009, 2010, 2011, 2012
 Girls Tennis State Champions - 1987, 1988, 1989, 1990
 Baseball State Champions – 1994
 Baseball State Finalists – 1998
 Wrestling State Champions - 1992, 2011
 Football State Champions – 1997, 2001, 2002, 2003, 2004, 2007, 2009, 2012
 Football State Finalists – 1994, 2000
 Marching Band NESBA Champions- 2008, 2011, 2016
 Girls Basketball State Champions- 2016
Girls Soccer State Champions- 2019

Since 2020, Feehan has been a full member of the highly-competitive Catholic Central League (CCL).

Notable athletic alumni 
 Mark Schmidt (1981): Head Coach of Men's Basketball at St. Bonaventure University
 Mark Coogan (1984): Decorated track athlete, former collegiate track star at University of Maryland, and member of the 1996 U.S. Olympic team.
 Jim Renner (2001): Professional golfer

References

External links 
 Bishop Feehan High School

Catholic secondary schools in Massachusetts
Schools in Bristol County, Massachusetts
Educational institutions established in 1961
1961 establishments in Massachusetts
Sisters of Mercy schools